Jowfe Oil Technology (JOT) is a state-owned Libyan petroleum services company providing oilfield chemicals and drilling equipment. JOT was founded in 1983 and registered under no. 7102 as a service company owned by the National Oil Corporation (NOC).

Operations
Jowfe Oil Technology is primarily involved in production and marketing of oilfield chemicals in Libya and adjacent areas. The company's mud and petroleum engineers provide technical services for drilling wells including: Preparing drilling proposals according to geologist reports; (2) wire line and production estimates; mud cleaner equipment, centrifugal hole shaker, fitting tools for casing, Production tubing and technical inspection; geological services to determine the type and depth of drilling beds containing hydrocarbons and gas; drilling fluids materials, power tongues, mud logging, oil separators, silk line services, and drill stem testing.

Jowfe Plants
Jowfe has three factories producing chemicals and materials for the oil industry. These include drilling fluids and treatment materials, chemicals used in manufacturing cleaning, paints and adhesive products. These factories are:

Grinding Particulates Plant (GPP) - capacity of 100,000 tpa; produces materials used in well drilling, cathodic protection systems, barite, bentonite and calcium carbonate. 
Liquid Products Plant (LPP) - capacity of 25000 bpa. Produces liquid chemicals used in drilling, production, storage, transportation and processing. Also produce chemicals for soaps, detergents,  paints and dyes.
Loss Circulation Materials Plant (LCM) - capacity of 4500 tpa. Also produces mica, crushed nut shells, wood fibers and salts.

Notes

References

Intsok Intsok Onshore Market Report 2006
National Authority for Information and Statistics, Socialist People’s Libyan Arab Jamahiriya.
Pilat D. (2000), Innovation and Productivity in Services - State of the Art, Organization for Economic Cooperation and Development, Directorate for Science, Technology, and Industry

Oil and gas companies of Libya
Cyrenaica
Energy companies established in 1983